Westbank Orphanage (sometimes called Westbank Protestant Orphanage or Westbank Children's Home) was a privately run Protestant orphanage in Greystones, County Wicklow, Ireland, which closed in the 1990s. Westbank was founded with the Protestant Home for Orphan & Destitute Girls moved from Harolds Cross in Dublin to Wicklow in the late 1940s, and began to accept boys as well as girls.
The regime at the orphanage was evangelical Christian and ran by Miss Adeline Mathers a born-again Christian. It tried to find homes for the children with families of the Protestant faith; as a result, a number of children would have been sent to families in Northern Ireland, England, and Scotland. Recently the orphanage has come into the public eye due to allegations of abuses.
In the 1960s children from another Protestant run home, the Bethany Home, were transferred to Westbank.  While not state-run or officially run by Church of Ireland, the orphanage was designated by the Church and state as place to send orphans of the Protestant faith. Westbank Greystones Protestant Orphanage Charity was registered with the Irish government as a charity and availed of tax benefits as a result.

Former residents Westbank Orphanage, Greystones and Ovoca House in Wicklow, have demanded inclusion in the Irish Governments 2002 redress scheme, and an apology.

After its closure in the late 1990s records were transferred to the PACT (Protestant Adoption Society), however in recent years these records have been handed back to Westbank to deal with.

Protestant Home for Orphan & Destitute Girls, Harolds Cross, Dublin

The Protestant Home for Orphan & Destitute Girls in Harolds Cross, Dublin, was established around 1860 in No. 201 Harolds Cross, in the house where the Quaker, the famous slavery abolitionist Richard Allen was born, in the home of his parents, a large red brick building dating from the mid-18th century. The Orphanage moved it Wicklow in the 1940s.

See also
 Kirwan House
 Belvedere Protestant Children's Orphanage
 Bethany Home
 Smyly Homes
 PACT (Protestant Adoption Society)

References

History of Christianity in Ireland